Canada–Ukraine relations are the bilateral ties between Canada and Ukraine.

Formal relations 

Diplomatic relations were established between Canada and Ukraine on December 2, 1991. Canada was the first western nation -and second country after Poland- to recognize Ukraine's independence from the USSR. Canada opened its embassy in Kyiv in April 1992, and the Embassy of Ukraine in Ottawa opened in October of that same year, paid for mostly by donations from the Ukrainian-Canadian community. Ukraine opened a consulate general in Toronto in 1993 and opened another in Edmonton in 2018.

The main bilateral agreement signed between the two governments is the joint declaration of the "Special Partnership" between the two countries signed in 1994 and renewed in 2001.

Sales of Canadian military hardware to Ukraine were permitted by the government of Justin Trudeau in December 2017, as Global Affairs Canada minister Chrystia Freeland lifted the restrictions that had been imposed for an undetermined period of time.

Free-trade agreement
On September 22, 2009, talks between Canada and Ukraine on a free trade agreement began.

In July 2015 Prime Minister of Ukraine Arseniy Yatsenyuk announced with Canadian Prime Minister Steven Harper the successful conclusion of the Canada-Ukraine Free Trade Agreement.

A Canada–Ukraine Free Trade Agreement was signed in July 2016 and entered into force on 1 August 2017.

High level visits
In 1992, the Governor General of Canada, Ramon Hnatyshyn, visited Ukraine—his ancestral homeland with which he closely identified—in his capacity as Vice-Regent. This was followed in 2005 by the formal state visit of Governor General Adrienne Clarkson and again in 2009 by Governor General Michaëlle Jean. In 1994, Ukraine's President Leonid Kuchma, in a gesture recognizing the importance of Ukraine-Canada relations, undertook a visit to Canada, his first state visit abroad. Canadian Prime Minister Jean Chrétien visited Ukraine in 1999. In 2008, Ukrainian President Viktor Yushchenko travelled to Ottawa and other centres as part of a state visit. While in Ottawa, he addressed a joint meeting of the House of Commons and Senate of the Canadian Parliament, a rare privilege extended foreign dignitaries.

The Annexation of Crimea by the Russian Federation occurred in March 2014. In September 2014, the Ukrainians visited Ottawa to plead for weapons, like anti-tank missiles, surveillance gear and armoured vehicles, with which to subdue the eastern separatists along the border with Russia. Defence Minister Jason Kenney said no. In July 2015 while Stephen Harper was still in power, it came to light that more than 5,400 Eryx anti-tank missiles, 10 Husky vehicles and Buffalo vehicles, four specialized landmine detection systems and 194 LAV-2 Light Armoured Vehicles had been declared surplus by the Canadian military.

In July 2016, Canadian Prime Minister Justin Trudeau visited Canadian military trainers who were in western Ukraine as part of the effort to subdue the separatists in the east along the border with Russia. In Kyiv a few days later, Petro Poroshenko thanked Canada for its contributions. The leaders signed a free-trade agreement on that date.

Arseniy Yatsenyuk, at that time the former prime minister of Ukraine, visited Ottawa in May 2017 on a fruitless quest for weaponry. He met with Chrystia Freeland and Ralph Goodale.

In July 2019, the Canadian government hosted the third Ukraine Reform Conference in Toronto for three days, where more than 800 people from 36 countries and international finance organizations like the IMF took part. The theme was the Euro-Atlantic integration of Ukraine. Newly inaugurated President Volodymyr Zelenskyy announced a new agreement for Canada to supply military hardware to Ukraine. The weapons would be used as part of the effort to subdue the separatists in the east along the border with Russia. Justin Trudeau refused to sign the agreement. Trudeau and Zelenskiy "declared a mutual interest in improving student exchanges and youth work permits" but nothing was done, although money was found to "promote gender equality".

In January 2022, Foreign Minister Mélanie Joly travelled to Ukraine to meet the Prime Minister and President Volodymyr Zelenskyy in the context of strong tensions between Ukraine and Russia. She also paid a visit to Canadian instructors who are training the Ukrainian army as part of Operation UNIFIER.

Politics

The main Canadian political parties are keen to be seen promoting democratic reform initiatives in Ukraine, encouraging Ukraine to engage and possibly join Western institutions such as the EU, NATO while distancing itself from Russia.  This is a delicate matter as the East vs West trajectory (Russia vs. Europe) is a normally sensitive political issue in Ukraine. Direct involvement would violate international protocol (seen as interference in Ukraine's internal affairs), and possibly undercut pro-Western forces in the country.  Nevertheless, many Canadians (including members of parliament, and former Prime Minister John Turner) were part of an international observer team that monitored Ukraine's 2004 presidential election.  Canadian media were typically sympathetic to the forces of the Orange Revolution, with the national magazine Maclean's running a front-page story on the protests.  Documented election irregularities by observer teams led to a re-run of the election resulting in the presidential electoral victory of the pro-Western Viktor Yushchenko. Canadian Governor-General Adrienne Clarkson, Canada's head-of-state representative, would attend Yushchenko's investiture wearing an orange scarf, the colour of the pro-Western movement.

Canadian Deputy Prime Minister Chrystia Freeland's maternal grandparents and mother emigrated from Ukraine. She was actively engaged with pro-democracy and pro-Western movements in Ukraine during the late 1980s.

Sub-national ties 

Much about the relationship is based on the legacy of migration. However, Ukrainians, migrating to Canada, did not come equally from all parts of Ukraine, nor did they move equally to all parts of Canada. The largest number of Ukrainian immigrants in the late nineteenth and early twentieth centuries settled in the Canadian Prairies and accounts for this region's strong cultural and historical ties with Ukraine, notably Western Ukraine from whence the majority came. Ontario has also been a province that has attracted Ukrainian immigrants, especially in the immediate post-war period. Recent immigration to Canada from post-independence Ukraine (post-1991) is a function of resumed immigration flows (prevented during the Soviet period) and targeted provincial immigration programs. The latter has resulted in migrants coming to those provinces (Saskatchewan, Manitoba) identifying Ukraine as a potentially significant area of immigrant recruitment for skilled workers.

The majority of Ukrainians who migrated to the Canadian province of Alberta between 1893 and 1929 came from a few small districts in western Ukraine, many of them in modern-day Ivano-Frankivsk Oblast.  Consequently, Alberta's premier Ralph Klein visited Ivano-Frankivsk in 2002, reciprocated by a subsequent visit to Edmonton from the governor of Ivano-Frankivsk, Mykhailo Vyshyvaniuk, at which time the two governments signed a trade and cooperation agreement. Alberta is expected to sign a similar document with neighbouring Lviv Oblast. Other recent significant contacts at the provincial level include Premier Roy Romanow's official visit to Ukraine in 1995 and the visit of Ukraine's President Leonid Kuchma to Saskatchewan at the invitation of Premier Romanow (2000), as well as delegations to Ukraine from Alberta, Manitoba and Saskatchewan at the ministerial level, all of which have led to a series of concluded agreements and memoranda of understanding on culture, education and economic matters. As a means to increasing prospective relations, a number of provincial jurisdictions have also established formal Advisory Committees (Saskatchewan-Ukraine Advisory Committee, Manitoba-Ukraine Secretariat, Advisory Council on Alberta-Ukraine Relations).

Finally, beyond a number of twinning regional agreements, e.g. Saskatchewan-Chernivtsi oblast, a number of Canadian cities are also twinned with Ukrainian municipal counterparts, strengthening cultural and social contacts at the local level. Twinned cities include Toronto/Kyiv, Winnipeg/Lviv, Vancouver/Odesa, and Saskatoon/Chernivtsi.

  Kyiv and  Toronto (Ontario)
  Chernivtsi and  Saskatoon (Saskatchewan)
  Lviv and  Winnipeg (Manitoba)
  Odesa and  Vancouver (British Columbia)
  Uzhhorod and  Hamilton (Ontario)
  Dnipro and  the Region of Durham (Ontario)

Humanitarian and development aid to Ukraine
Canadian organizations, including non-governmental, are active in providing different kinds of aid to Ukraine. Canadian International Development Agency (CIDA) funded the establishment of Centre for Small Business and Economic Development (SBEDIF) in Ivano-Frankivsk. An additional  was committed for a regional network project to support small business growth and economic development in five additional communities in the same oblast of Western Ukraine.

The Canada-Ukraine Chamber of Commerce (CUCC) plays an important role in promoting trade and business ties between the two countries.

In 2016, Global Affairs Canada established the Canada-Ukraine Trade and Investment Support (CUTIS) Project, which is budgeted for five years and was designed "to lower poverty in Ukraine through increasing exports from Ukraine to Canada and investment from Canada to Ukraine".

As recently as July 2016 Canadian non-governmental organizations also have substantially provided aid to the Ukrainian army and set up rehabilitation clinics for Ukrainian soldiers during the War in Donbass.

On 22 March 2022 Reuters News, which employed Freeland for a decade, had an article entitled "On the Ukraine refugee crisis, watch Canada", and then in early April 2022 the Trudeau government cleared the immigration barriers for Ukrainian refugees.

Educational contacts
The longest standing educational partnership at the post-secondary level is that of between the University of Saskatchewan and Chernivtsi National University. An inter-university agreement has been in existence between the two partners since 1977.  The relationship, however, currently operates through the Ramon Hnatyshyn Canadian Studies Centre, a research and teaching unit created in 2003 and devoted to Canadian studies at Chernivtsi National University. The National University of Kyiv-Mohyla Academy has also established a Canadian Studies Center in 2009 to help facilitate the study of Canada and to foster greater inter-university contact and scholarly exchange. 

Bilateral exchanges between Canadian and Ukrainian universities exist in the sciences, social sciences and humanities across a variety of fields. Canadian universities and colleges with active exchange programs include: University of Alberta, University of Manitoba, University of Saskatchewan, University of Toronto, Queen's University, St. Thomas More College and MacEwan University.

In 1991, with the support of the Chair of Ukrainian Studies Foundation of Toronto, the Canada-Ukraine Parliamentary Program (CUPP) was created. CUPP has provided Ukrainian university students with an opportunity to learn how democracy functions in Canada by working closely with Canadian Members of Parliament of all parties. Ukrainian students are competitively selected from among 48 participating institutions of higher-learning in Ukraine.

Involvement in the Russian-Ukrainian war  

Since the February 2014 Annexation of Crimea by the Russian Federation, the relations between protagonists have been tinged with a military dimension. The Annexation occurred during the 41st Canadian Parliament during which the country was governed by the Harper Ministry in which Rob Nicholson served as Minister of Defence.

On 17 April 2014 the Canadian Armed Forces (CAF) offered assets and members to NATO and called this engagement Operation REASSURANCE.

In September 2014 the Ukrainians visited Ottawa to plead for weapons, like anti-tank missiles, surveillance gear and armoured vehicles, with which to subdue the eastern separatists along the border with Russia. Their quest did not bear fruit.

At the Brussels NATO Ministerial conference in February 2015, Nicholson offered no weapons to Ukraine; in this respect he agreed with Ursula von der Leyen who was at the time the German Minister of Defense. "We've been very clear in our support for Ukraine. We've signed a defense cooperation agreement, and we have been sending considerable non-lethal aid to Ukraine over the last number of months, as well as assistance in other forms, and that's what we're going to continue."

On 14 April 2015 newly-promoted Minister of National Defence Jason Kenney announced Canadian military personnel would instruct Ukrainian forces as part of a $700 million gift he called Operation UNIFIER.

It came to light in July 2015 while Stephen Harper was still in power, that more than 5,400 Eryx anti-tank missiles, 10 Husky vehicles and Buffalo vehicles, four specialized landmine detection systems and 194 LAV-2 Light Armoured Vehicles had been declared surplus by the Canadian military instead of being sent to aid the Ukrainians.

On 4 November 2015 Justin Trudeau inaugurated his 29th Canadian Ministry, having won a majority in elections to the 42nd Canadian Parliament. He appointed Harjit Sajjan as his first Minister of Defence.

Sales of Canadian military hardware to Ukraine were permitted by the government of Trudeau in December 2017, as Global Affairs Canada minister Chrystia Freeland lifted the restrictions that had been imposed for an undetermined period of time.

Soon after the 2019 Canadian federal election was won by Trudeau, who had faced down Andrew Scheer, a supporter of sending Canadian peacekeepers to Ukraine, Ukrainian deputy foreign minister Vasyl Bodnar in the government of Volodymyr Zelenskyy revived the idea of sending Canadian peacekeepers to the war-torn Donbass territory of Ukraine.

Freeland was named Minister of Finance in August 2020 after the previous minister, Bill Morneau, refused to accede to Trudeau's request for more helicopter money and because he was lukewarm on the goals of the WEF. The position gave her command of such tools as FINTRAC. Freeland was noted by the KGB for fomenting anti-Soviet sentiment in Kiev in the late 1980s.

On 1 February 2022 rumours of open conflict were thick and a helpful list of Canadian sanctions tools was provided by consultant attorneys. There were then three pieces of secondary legislation that collectively formed the "Sanctions Regime":
 Special Economic Measures (Russia) Regulations (SEMRR)
 Special Economic Measures (Ukraine) Regulations (SEMUR)
 Freezing Assets of Corrupt Foreign Officials (Ukraine) Regulations (FACFOUR)

On 23 February Canada announced first round of new economic sanctions on Russia over Ukraine crisis. The United States, the European Union, Germany and Britain also announced financial punishments of Russia. Trudeau said his government "will ban Canadians from all financial dealings with the so-called" DPR and LPR. He was also to "ban Canadians from engaging in purchases of Russian sovereign debt." Trudeau promised to "sanction members of the Russian parliament who voted for the decision to recognize Donetsk and Luhansk as independent."

On 24 February Russia invaded Ukraine.

On 27 February Omar Alghabra ordered Transport Canada to close Canadian airspace to Russian owned aircraft. The next day there was some confusion over "humanitarian" flights by Russian aircraft.

On 3 March Freeland sanctioned Russian companies Rosneft and Gazprom. Canada had already banned Russian vessels from its waters.

On 5 March Freeland imposed additional sanctions, for example it removed Russia and Belarus from "most-favored nation status", which automatically places a mandatory 35% tariff on all imports from the two countries.

On 6 March Transport Canada fined the owners of a plane that was chartered by Russians. Russians can still travel as passengers.

On 7 March the Canadians imposed sanctions on 10 Russian individuals in connection with the invasion of Ukraine.

On 12 March Transport Canada grounded a Volga Dnepr An-124 Russian airliner it had contracted, as it intended to enforce a Notice to Airmen it had drafted especially for the occasion. The regulator said it "will not hesitate to take further enforcement action should additional incidents of non-compliance with the regulations and restrictions be found."

On 15 March 15 more Russian officials were sanctioned. More than 900 "individuals and entities" had been targeted by then. The Russians responded on 15 March and targeted 313 Canadian individuals.

On 18 March a report documented the Russian seizure of Canadian (and other) flagged aircraft.

The L3 Harris Wescam gyro-compensated cameras were revealed to be the choice of the manufacturer of the Bayraktar UAV for their drones were pledged by the Trudeau government in late March.

On 24 March it was revealed to a Parliamentary committee that the CAF had barred its active-duty service members from entering the Ukraine Foreign Legion.

Prior to 21 April Canada had sent 4,500 M-72 rocket launchers and 100 Carl Gustaf anti-tank systems to Ukraine.

On 22 April Canada sent from its warehouse of 37 units an unknown number of 155mm M777 Howitzers.

On 26 April Canada pledged to send eight Rohsel light armoured vehicles to Ukraine.

On 8 May, Prime Minister Justin Trudeau made a surprise visit to Kyiv to meet with Ukrainian president Volodymyr Zelenskyy.

On 8 June Foreign Minister Mélanie Joly announced a ban under the SEMRR on the export of 28 services vital for the operation of the oil, gas and chemical industries, including technical, management, accounting and advertising services.

See also  
 Foreign relations of Canada 
 Foreign relations of Ukraine
 Ukrainian Canadian
 Canadian Ukrainian
 Embassy of Ukraine, Ottawa
 Anti-Ukrainian sentiment in Canada
 Canada–Ukraine Free Trade Agreement (CUFTA)
 Cyclone-4M

References

External links 
 Embassy of Ukraine in Canada - Political Affairs 
 Canadian Embassy in Kyiv - Canada & Ukraine 

 
Ukraine
Bilateral relations of Ukraine